The Marathon-class cruiser was a class of second class cruiser of the Royal Navy ordered under the naval programme of 1887.

Three of the ships, Melpomene, Magicienne and Marathon, were built for foreign (tropical) service, with a sheath of wood and copper - this added weight and made them slightly slower.

Ships

Boiler trials 
By 1901, the Royal Navy had ordered eight Dürr boilers from Germany, to be installed as a trial on board  as a substitute for the Belleville boilers then in naval use.

Notes

References

External links

www.battleships-cruisers.co.uk

Cruiser classes
 
Ship classes of the Royal Navy